Otto F. Otepka (May 6, 1915 – March 20, 2010) was a Deputy Director of the United States State Department's Office of Security in the late 1950s and early 1960s. He was fired as the State Department's chief security evaluations officer on November 5, 1963; he had furnished classified files to the United States Senate Subcommittee on Internal Security. Otepka was later appointed by Richard Nixon to a position on the Subversive Activities Control Board; he retired in 1972.

Background
Otepka was born in Chicago in 1915, and graduated from the Columbus School of Law. He served in the US Navy during World War II.

Career
Otepka was a Deputy Director of the United States State Department's Office of Security in the late 1950s and early 1960s. This was at the beginning of the Eisenhower Administration and Otepka's "Evaluations" section was faced with Senator Joseph McCarthy who was at the height of his power and making accusations that Communists and Communist sympathizers had infiltrated the U.S. Army and U.S. Department of State. Otepka was assisted by another newcomer to the State Department, William L. Uanna, who would soon head up "Physical Security" at State. Otepka, Uanna and R. W. Scott McLeod, another newcomer in Security at State, were mentioned in a 1954 article in The Reporter entitled "Big Brother at Foggy Bottom." The article describes how the State Department implemented Eisenhower's answer to McCarthy - Executive Order 10450 - and the reaction to it by State's employees.

The Office of Security was often simply known as "SY" and in the 1980s became the Diplomatic Security Service. Otepka was in charge of vetting clearances for the State Department, and he gained public attention when he was sidelined and then later fired by Secretary of State Dean Rusk. Otepka claimed he was punished for not clearing names proposed by the Kennedy administration for employment in the State Department. Some of these names had previously been banned during the Eisenhower administration, according to at least one source. Also, investigative journalist Clark Mollenhoff detailed the Otepka story in his 1965 book Despoilers of Democracy. Mollenhoff noted that Otepka was punished and subjected to illegal surveillance for giving testimony to Congress about security procedures at the State Department, as much as for his concern about the rampant use of emergency clearances by the Kennedy administration. Two officers, including Deputy Assistant Secretary John F. Reilly, perjured themselves before the Senate Internal Security Subcommittee and had to resign in November 1963. However, Senate efforts notwithstanding, Otto Otepka was relegated to a meaningless position before his termination. So were some of his colleagues who had backed his efforts.

By the late 1960s, there was a Congressional hearing into the dismissal of Otepka but in the end Otepka was never returned to his previous station.

In March 1969, Otepka was appointed by Richard Nixon to a position on the Subversive Activities Control Board. After some difficult Senate confirmation hearings, the Senate confirmed his position.

Otepka retired in 1972 and moved to Cape Coral, Florida, in 1975. He was a member of the Association of Former Intelligence Officers.

Bibliography
Books by other authors
 Gill, William J.The Ordeal of Otto Otepka. New Rochelle, New York: Arlington House, 1969.
 Mollenhoff, Clark R. Despoilers of Democracy. New York, New York: Doubleday, 1965.

References

External links
 BBC article on DSS
 U.S. Diplomatic Security Website
 Washington Post article on DS
 Diplomatic Security Special Agents Association
 Unofficial Diplomatic Security Special Agent Forum
 Mobile Security Deployments (MSD)
 Computer Investigations & Forensics Investigative Resource Page
 Office of Foreign Missions
 2006 interview with Otto Otepka
 Otto Otepka's obituary
 Otepka's FBI files hosted at the Internet Archive

1915 births
2010 deaths
Columbus School of Law alumni
United States Navy personnel of World War II
People from Chicago
United States Department of State officials